Xavier Corosine (born 12 Marc 1985) is a French basketball player who plays for the French Pro A league club SOMB Boulogne-sur-Mer. Having a height of 1.85 m (6 ft 1 in), Corosine usually plays as point guard or shooting guard.

References

1985 births
Living people
Élan Chalon players
Étoile Charleville-Mézières players
French men's basketball players
Nanterre 92 players
Paris Racing Basket players
Metropolitans 92 players
Point guards
Shooting guards
SOMB Boulogne-sur-Mer players
Sportspeople from Fréjus